Yoann Bouchard (born 1 December 1976 in La Charité-sur-Loire) is a French former footballer who played as a goalkeeper. He last played for Besançon Racing Club until the end of the 2009-10 season. He previously appeared in Ligue 2 for Nîmes and Clermont Foot and the Spanish Segunda División for Racing de Ferrol and Elche.

Teams
1996-1999: AJ Auxerre
1999-2000: Grenoble Foot 38
2000-2002: Nîmes
2002–2003: AS Cannes
2003-2004: Clermont Foot
2004–2006: Racing de Ferrol
2006-2008 Elche CF
2008-2010: Besançon RC

External links

1976 births
Living people
French footballers
AJ Auxerre players
Grenoble Foot 38 players
Nîmes Olympique players
AS Cannes players
Clermont Foot players
Racing de Ferrol footballers
Elche CF players
Racing Besançon players
Association football goalkeepers